Artyom Aleksandrovich Pershin (born 6 February 1988) is a Russian former footballer. He last played for FC Volgar Astrakhan in the Russian National Football League.

References

Russian footballers
Living people
1988 births
FC Saturn Ramenskoye players
FC Khimki players
FC Baltika Kaliningrad players
Russian Premier League players
FC Volgar Astrakhan players
Association football midfielders
FC Dynamo Saint Petersburg players